The 1996–97 North West Counties Football League season was the 15th in the history of the North West Counties Football League, a football competition in England. Teams were divided into two divisions: Division One and Division Two.

Division One 

Division One featured two new teams, promoted from Division Two:

 Atherton Collieries
 Vauxhall GM

League table

Division Two 

Division Two featured four new teams:

 Garswood United, promoted as champions of the Mid-Cheshire League Division One
 Leek CSOB, promoted as champions of the Midland League
 Skelmersdale United, relegated from Division One
 Colne, a new team

League table

References

External links 
 NWCFL Official Site

North West Counties Football League seasons
8